Kevin Ortega Pimentel (born 26 March 1992) is a Peruvian football referee who is a listed international referee for FIFA since 2019.

He has also been officiating matches in the Primera División since 2015.

Ortega is one of the youngest referees in the Peruvian Football Federation.

Biography
Kevin Ortega was born in Callao on 26 March 1992.

He had worked in SUNAT from 2014 to 2015. On 12 May 2015, Ortega made his debut in the Primera División, the highest Peruvian division, at the age of 23. During the game between Unión Comercio and Alianza Atlético (5–2), he drew the yellow card twice.

Ortega became an international referee on the FIFA list in 2019.

He made his international debut in March 2019 in a match at the 2019 South American U-17 Soccer Championship between Argentina national under-17 football team and Colombia. He was summoned to officiate a senior friendly match on November of that year in a friendly match between Ecuador and Trinidad and Tobago.

Ortega has also been regularly used in the South American club competitions, the Copa Libertadores and the Copa Sudamericana. At the Copa Libertadores game between Club Always Ready from Bolivia and Boca Juniors from Argentina in May 2022, he was at the center of a controversy. Boca Juniors won the game 1–0 on a controversial penalty, after which the Bolivian police searched the referee's booth and seized several Boca Junior shirts that had been given to the referee team before the game. Always Ready representatives accused Ortega of taking advantage, while Boca Juniors commented that the gifts were a standard gesture.

Ortega had potential to officiate major tournaments, primarily the 2022 FIFA World Cup.

In 2021, FIFA nominated Ortega for the Tokyo 2020 Summer Olympics Football Tournament, where he featured in three games including a semi-final. In May 2022, Ortega was appointed in the 36 referee squad for the 2022 FIFA World Cup in Qatar. He will be accompanied by his assistants Michael Orué and Jesús Sánchez.

References

1992 births
Living people
Peruvian football referees